Elytropappus is a genus of flowering plants in the family Asteraceae, native to southern Africa.

Species 
 Elytropappus aridus Koek.
 Elytropappus hispidus (L.f.) Druce
 Elytropappus microphyllus	
 Elytropappus monticola Koek.
 Elytropappus scaber (L.f.) Levyns

References

Gnaphalieae
Asteraceae genera
Flora of Southern Africa